A Lady with a Fan is a 1645-1650 painting by Ferdinand Bol, now in the National Gallery, London, to which it was bequeathed by Miss A.M. Philips in 1946. The subject has not been identified, though her clothing allows the painting to be dated. The underdrawing of the painting includes several pentimenti, showing the artist changed the composition as he produced the work.

References

1640s paintings
Portraits by Ferdinand Bol
Collections of the National Gallery, London
Portraits of women